Mohammad Akram (born 11 May 1964) is a former Pakistani cricketer. From Kasur, Punjab, all of Mohammad's first-class matches were played for Lahore Division, during the 1984–85 and 1985–86 seasons of the BCCP Patron's Trophy. An opening batsman, he made his debut for the team against Gujranwala in October 1984, opening with Amjad Ali in the first innings and Zahid Shah in the second innings. Although usually playing as a wicket-keeper in lower levels, Mohammad only kept wicket once in first-class matches, against Lahore City Whites in November 1985. He finished his career with 129 runs from four matches, with his highest score an innings of 33 runs against Lahore City Blues.

References

1964 births
Living people
Lahore Division cricketers
Pakistani cricketers
People from Kasur District
Wicket-keepers